Live 1972 is the third album of the British progressive rock band, Gnidrolog. The album was recorded live in Birmingham on 10 July 1972 and released in 1999 as the band's only live album. The album's bonus track was recorded live in Aylesbury on 8 July 1972. The album introduced four Gnidrolog songs which have never been released, while re-releasing only three tracks, "I could never be a soldier", from the Lady Lake album, "Time and Space" and "In Spite of Harry's Toenail", from the In Spite of Harry's Toenail album. The album was released after the band reunited, following a 27-year breakup. This comeback saw the recording and release of one more album, Gnosis, released later in 2000.

Track listing

Personnel 
 Colin Goldring - lead vocals, guitar, saxophone, recorder, tenor horn, harmonica
 Stewart Goldring - lead guitar, vocals
 Peter "Mars" Cowling - bass guitar, cello
 Nigel Pegrum - percussion, flute, oboe
 John Earle -  alto, tenor, baritone and soprano saxophones, flute, vocals

1999 live albums
Gnidrolog albums